"I Want It All" is the second single from the Walt Disney Pictures film, High School Musical 3: Senior Year, and is the third track on the High School Musical 3 soundtrack. The song is performed by Ashley Tisdale and Lucas Grabeel as Sharpay Evans and Ryan Evans.

Song information
The Radio Edit version of the song premiered on Radio Disney on August 15, 2008, as part of its Planet Premiere featurette. An extended version of the song was released on iTunes on September 9, 2008, available to digital download. The song is currently playing only on Radio Disney, reaching number 1 on radio's weekly countdown. The song and eleven other songs from the High School Musical 3 soundtrack were pre-nominated in the "Best Original Song" category for The 81st Academy Awards. The final nominations were announced on January 22, 2009, and not any of the songs from the soundtrack got a nomination., but according to Billboard, the song should have been nominated.
The song was used as background music in Britain's Got Talent (series 3) auditions.

Music videos

Two previews of the movie scene (credited as the two official music videos of the song) premiered on Disney Channel during the world premiere of The Cheetah Girls: One World, on August 22, 2008. Both feature Sharpay and Ryan singing and dancing about fame and glamour, but playing different parts of the song. The third preview of the movie scene was released on October 17, 2008. It plays another part of the song and shows brand new scenes with Sharpay and Ryan being superstars and a special appearance by Zac Efron.

Track listings

Chart performance
I Want It All stayed for four weeks on the Bubbling Under Hot 100 Singles chart and never entered on Billboard Hot 100. It also debuted on #3 on Hot 100 Singles Sales chart but fell out on the next week. Outside from the U.S, the song debuted on #75 on Canadian Hot Digital Songs chart but didn't enter on the official chart. Also, debuted on #87 on UK Singles Chart.

Charts

References

External links
 Walt Disney Records Official Site
 Official album information

2008 singles
Ashley Tisdale songs
Lucas Grabeel songs
Songs from High School Musical (franchise)
Songs written by Matthew Gerrard
Songs written by Robbie Nevil
Walt Disney Records singles
2008 songs
Song recordings produced by Matthew Gerrard
Male–female vocal duets